Volodymyr Pasternak (born 6 November 1989) is a Ukrainian sport shooter.

He participated at the 2018 ISSF World Shooting Championships, winning a medal.

References

External links

Living people
1989 births
Ukrainian male sport shooters
ISSF pistol shooters